Cooksley is a surname. Notable people with the surname include:

Bert Cooksley OBE (1892–1980), New Zealand politician of the National Party
Graeme Cooksley, New Zealand former rugby league footballer, represented NZ in the 1970 and 1972 World Cups
Harry Cooksley (born 1994), English association footballer
Mark Cooksley (born 1971), former professional rugby union player and All Black lock

See also
Cookley
Cooksey
Cooley (disambiguation)